Daminda Ranawaka (born 29 March 1983) is a Sri Lankan cricketer. He played two first-class matches in 2012 and one List A match in 2005. He was also part of Sri Lanka's squad for the 2002 Under-19 Cricket World Cup.

References

External links
 

1983 births
Living people
Sri Lankan cricketers
Kandy Youth Cricket Club cricketers
Kurunegala Youth Cricket Club cricketers
Sportspeople from Kandy